Carlos Salgado (May 21, 1940 – October 11, 2007) was a Honduran radio journalist and comedian. Salgado hosted a satirical radio show called Bean the Terrible and focused on social commentary and the satirising of well-known public figures in Honduras. His career as a popular radio journalist and commentator lasted more than 40 years.

Assassination 
Salgado was shot several times as he left his job at Radio Cadena Voices in Tegucigalpa on October 11, 2007. He was taken to a local hospital in the capital city where he was pronounced dead. Salgado was 67 years old. Salgado's killers escaped. It was unclear exactly why Salgado was murdered, though his radio show often criticized social conditions and politics in Honduras.

Before the murder, some of the station's journalists had been intimidated and received death threats. Manuel Zelaya had said to the station's correspondent Carolina Torres "If I was Hugo Chávez, I would have had this radio station shut down a long time ago." Salgado's killing came at a time of increased tension between the Honduran media and the government of Honduran President Manuel Zelaya. The Honduran media had been increasingly critical of several of Zelaya's policies.

References

1940 births
2007 deaths
Honduran people of Galician descent
Honduran radio journalists
Male journalists
Honduran political journalists
Assassinated Honduran journalists
Deaths by firearm in Honduras
Place of birth missing